José Daniel Bandez Salazar (born 10 October 1999) is a Venezuelan footballer who plays for Deportes Antofagasta.

References

External links
 

1999 births
Living people
People from Calabozo
People from Guárico
Venezuelan footballers
Venezuelan Primera División players
Chilean Primera División players
Primera B de Chile players
Carabobo F.C. players
C.D. Antofagasta footballers
Rangers de Talca footballers
A.C. Barnechea footballers
Deportes Copiapó footballers
Association football forwards